Multan Electric Power Company (MEPCO), formerly known as Multan Power Supply Company, is an electric distribution company which supplies electricity to thirteen districts of South Punjab, Pakistan. This company generates electric power from water (hydro-electric power) and distributes it to approximately thirty-four million people of the area. MEPCO is licensee who has been granted license by the NEPRA for distribution of electricity exclusively to service territory spread over thirteen administrative districts of Southern Punjab.

History 
Multan Electric Power Company was founded as Multan Power Supply Company during British India-era. In 1972, the company was nationalized and subsequently was taken over by the Government of Pakistan. It was publicly listed on Karachi Stock Exchange until 1985 when it was de-listed from the exchange.
 
On 14 May 1998, Government of Pakistan decided to go with corporatization of the energy sector in Pakistan. MEPCO was established to acquire all properties, rights, assets, obligations and liabilities of the defunct Multan Area Electricity Board, grid stations and transmission lines of the supply system. After 24 years of service in 2022, MEPCO has been directly and exclusively supplying electricity to 34 million people of 13 districts of South Punjab.

Operations 
MEPCO is the largest power distribution company in Pakistan operating exclusively in 13 administrative districts of southern Punjab i.e. Multan, Muzaffargarh, Layyah, Dera Ghazi Khan, Taunsa Sharif, Shadan Lound, Kot Addu, Tribal area of Dera Ghazi Khan, Fort Manro, Rajanpur, Lodhran, Basti Maluk, Bahawalpur, Rahim Yar Khan, Khanewal, Sahiwal, Pakpattan, Vehari and Bahawalnagar. In other words, it covers 50 constituencies of National Assembly of Pakistan and 104 constituencies of Punjab Assembly. The service territory of the company is mostly rural, so its customers profile is heavily dominated by domestic category and that too by life line customers.

See also

 List of electric supply companies in Pakistan

References

Distribution companies of Pakistan
Companies based in Multan
Government-owned companies of Pakistan
Energy in Punjab, Pakistan
1947 establishments in Pakistan